Igor Grabovetchi (born 24 July 1967) is a Moldovan wrestler. He placed sixth in Greco-Roman wrestling, heavyweight class, at the 1996 Summer Olympics in Atlanta. He has represented Moldova numerous times at the World and European championships.

References

External links

1967 births
Living people
Olympic wrestlers of Moldova
Wrestlers at the 1996 Summer Olympics
Moldovan male sport wrestlers
20th-century Moldovan people